Zumba Fitness may refer to:

Video games 
Zumba Fitness (video game), a video game
Zumba Fitness 2, a video game
Zumba Fitness Core, a video game
Zumba Fitness: World Party, a video game
Zumba Kids, a video game

Other uses 
Zumba AKA Zumba Fitness, physical exercise movement created by dancer and choreographer Beto Perez
Zumba Fitness Dance Party, a compilation album of dance hits

See also
Zumba (disambiguation)